Wardman Row is a block of historic apartment buildings at 1416-1440 R Street, NW in Washington, D.C. The buildings, located in the Greater Fourteenth Street Historic District were designed in 1911 by Harry Wardman and Albert Beers. In 1984, the buildings were placed on the National Register of Historic Places.

See also
 National Register of Historic Places listings in Washington, D.C.

References

External links
 

Residential buildings completed in 1911
Apartment buildings in Washington, D.C.
Neoclassical architecture in Washington, D.C.
Residential buildings on the National Register of Historic Places in Washington, D.C.
District of Columbia Inventory of Historic Sites